London/Chapeskie Field Airport  is located  northeast of London, Ontario, Canada.

See also
 List of airports in the London, Ontario area

References

Registered aerodromes in Ontario
Transport in London, Ontario